Deodatus Royce House is a historic home located at Berkshire in Tioga County, New York. It is a two-story, five-bay, Federal style house built of brick about 1830.  A single story ell extends from the rear.

It was listed on the National Register of Historic Places in 1984.

References

Houses on the National Register of Historic Places in New York (state)
Federal architecture in New York (state)
Houses completed in 1830
Houses in Tioga County, New York
1830 establishments in New York (state)
National Register of Historic Places in Tioga County, New York